The 1991–92 Hamburger SV season was the 45th season in the club's history and the 29th consecutive season playing in the Bundesliga. Hamburger SV finished twelfth in the league.

The club also participated in the DFB-Pokal and UEFA Cup, where it reached second round and third round respectively.

Competitions

Overview

Bundesliga

League table

Matches

DFB Pokal

UEFA Cup

First round

Second round

Third round

Statistics

Squad statistics

|}

References

Hamburger SV seasons
Hamburger